Polkovnikovo is a rural locality (a selo) and the administrative center of Polkovnikovsky Selsoviet, Kosikhinsky District, Altai Krai, Russia. The population was 690 as of 2013. There are 17 streets.

Geography 
Polkovnikovo is located 19 km south of Kosikha (the district's administrative centre) by road. Nalobikha is the nearest rural locality.

References 

Rural localities in Kosikhinsky District